Towie Barclay Castle is a historic castle in Aberdeenshire, Scotland, 4.5 miles south-south-east of Turriff. The current structure was built in 1593 by Clan Barclay. The site was given to the Clan in the 11th century by Malcolm III of Scotland. Following Clan Barclay's pillage of a nunnery in the 12th century, Thomas the Rhymer proclaimed: "Towie Barclay of the Glen/Happy to the maids/But never to the men." which was interpreted as a curse on the male line. Belief in the curse was strong enough that it was given as a reason by Mr. Barclay Maitland for the sale of Towie Barclay Castle in 1753 to the Earl of Findlater, who, after "dreeing the weird," (the ''weird'', meaning the curse) and after his son also died, sold it to Gordon's Hospital in Aberdeen in 1792.

The building was sold to the governors of Robert Gordon's hospital in Aberdeen for £21,000. Despite a reroofing project in 1874, Towie Barclay Castle had fallen into a state of neglect by the mid-20th century.

Nineteenth-century description and history

An excellent description of the castle was written in 1887, published in volume two of the book The Castellated and Domestic Architecture of Scotland from the Twelfth to the Eighteenth Century by David MacGibbon and Thomas Ross, published by D. Douglas:

          This interesting house is in the southern part of the parish of Turriff, and not far from the Auchterless railway station.

The family of Tollie de Berkley, to whom it belonged, is very ancient, and the following inscription on a stone built into the wall has given the impression that the castle is also of very old date, viz., “Sir Alexander Barclay of Tolly, foundator, deceisit anno domini 1186.”  On the same stone is carved the following inscription: “In tim of Valth al men semis friendly and frindis not knauin but in adversity, 1593.”

There can be no doubt that the first part of the above inscription is a mere record of what had happened long before, and was inserted at the date last quoted, “1593.”  In 1792 the turrets and embrasures were removed and two stories taken off the height of the keep, and the fosse filled up.

The family suffered from espousing Queen Mary’s cause.  From 1558 to 1624 the estate was held by Patrick Barclay, who was the author of the moral reflection above quoted,--the result of his unfortunate experience.

The plan of this castle is a slight modification of the plain quadrangular keep, a small break being made in the wall adjoining the entrance door.  This gives room for the passage to the staircase, and also admits of a loophole commanding the entrance.  The ingoing of this loophole is defended internally with a stone pillar, so placed as to permit those inside to see out, and at the same time os designed as to intercept missiles from without.

The basement is all vaulted, and the vault over the small entrance lobby is ornamented with ribbed and groined vaulting.  The latter peculiarity seems to be local.  A similar loop next the doorway, and groined vault in the entrance lobby, exists at Gight, and a corresponding ribbed vault at the original entrance still remains at Delgaty.

The basement contains the usually cellars, with small loopholes, one cellar having a private stair to the hall.

The principal staircase leading to the first floor is partly straight, with a wheel round the corner of the tower and a good landing at the door to the hall.  The hall is of the usual form, but is much more ornate than in most castles.  It is 30 feet by 20 feet, and is vaulted in two compartments, with a groined and ribbed vault, springing from corbels carved with foliage.  There is also a small and carefully finished and vaulted gallery in the thickness of the wall over the door to the hall, with a wide opening towards the hall.  The gallery has ribbed vaulting, and the bosses are carved with the monogram I.H.S., and with a heart and the pierced hands and feet of our Savior.  The corvels from which the ribs spring have shields containing the emblems of the four Evangelists.  On each side of the opening towards the hall are canopied niches for statues.  Everything seems to point to this gallery having been an oratory or chapel.  It is entered by a small stair from the floor above, so that the baron and his family might use it privately, or by drawing a curtain it might be opened to the hall, when all assembled there might witness the service.

Billings’ view of the interior gives a good idea of these features, which all seem to point to the work having been designed by some one accustomed to ecclesiastical architecture.  Groined vaulting of the kind here adopted is rare in the castles of Scotland, but one other example occurs at Balbegno in Kincardineshire, which is of the same period.  The hall of Auchendoun was also vaulted in a similar manner, but it belongs to an earlier period.  From the ecclesiastical features of the building Mr. Billings infers that it is at least a century earlier than the date upon it (1593).  But from the similarity of the vaulting at Balbegno, the date of which is 1569, and from the correspondence of the plan, and the little ribbed vault at the entrance, with such castles as Gight and Delgaty, we have no hesitation in assigning it to the middle of the sixteenth century.  At Edzell too we find ribbed and groined vaulting in the summer-house, along with features which are undoubtedly of the latter half of the sixteenth century.

There is a small private room over the entrance lobby.  As already mentioned, the upper floors have been altered or removed.  (pages 51-52)

Restoration

The castle was bought in the late 1960s by the musician Marc Ellington and his wife, Karen. A programme of restoration was funded by Marc Ellington's music career while his wife project-managed the extensive restorative work on the building, which took over 7 years to complete.  While the lower story contains sixteenth century masonry, the upper floors are a modern reconstruction.  The restoration project was of a sufficiently high standard to win a Saltire Society Award in 1973. As of 2008, the castle remains in the ownership of the Ellington Family.  In addition to owning Towie Barclay, the Ellingtons are also Lairds of Gardenstown and Crovie.

Bibliography
MacGibbon, David and Thomas Ross. The Castellated and Domestic Architecture of Scotland from the Twelfth to the Eighteenth Century  D. Douglas, 1887.

References

Castles in Aberdeenshire
Houses completed in 1593
Category A listed buildings in Aberdeenshire
Listed castles in Scotland
Clan Barclay